Gary Gayle Wisener (August 24, 1938 – December 7, 2020) was an American football wide receiver in the National Football League for the Dallas Cowboys. He also was a member of the Houston Oilers in the American Football League, during their second AFL Championship season. He played college football at Baylor University.

Early years
Wisener attended Fort Smith High School before moving on to Baylor University.

He became a starter as a senior at left offensive end. During the 1960 Southwest Conference Track and Field Championships, he won first place in the javelin competition, while also placing in the broad jump and the high hurdles.

Professional career

Dallas Cowboys
Wisener was selected by the Boston Patriots in the 1960 AFL Draft, but instead chose to sign with the NFL's Dallas Cowboys as a free agent. In training camp he was limited by a cut heel he suffered while taking a shower.

He made the team and was a part of the franchise's inaugural season, playing mainly as a backup safety in 10 games (3 starts). He was waived on September 5, 1961.

Houston Oilers
On September 22, 1961, he was signed by the Houston Oilers and was a part of the team that won the American Football League Championship. He was released on August 21, 1962.

References

1938 births
2020 deaths
People from Warren, Arkansas
Players of American football from Arkansas
American football wide receivers
Baylor Bears football players
Baylor Bears men's track and field athletes
Dallas Cowboys players
Houston Oilers players
American Football League players